AS Sigui is a Malian football club based in Kayes. At the end of the 2006/7 season, they were relegated from the Malien Premiere Division to the D1 (second division) in Malian football. Their home stadium is Stade Abdoulaye Nakoro Cissoko.

Achievements
 Malien Cup: 1
 1987

Performance in CAF competitions
CAF Cup: 1 appearance
1993 – Second Round

CAF Cup Winners' Cup: 1 appearance
1988 – Preliminary Round

Football clubs in Mali
Kayes